Penthesilea sacculalis is a species of moth of the family Pyralidae. It is found in Florida, Georgia, Louisiana, Texas, North Carolina, Virginia and Arizona.

The forewings are dark brown to fuscous, the basal angle is occasionally overscaled with reddish-brown, the base darker than the distal part. The hindwings are dark brown to fuscous.

Subspecies
Penthesilea sacculalis sacculalis
Penthesilea sacculalis baboquivariensis Cashatt in Solis, Cashatt & Scholtens, 2012 (Arizona)

References

Moths described in 1891
Chrysauginae
Taxa named by Émile Louis Ragonot